Britt Gerda Hallqvist, née Nyman (14 February 1914 in Umeå, Sweden – 20 March 1997 in Lund, Sweden) was a Swedish hymnwriter, poet, and translator. Her grandfather was the medical professor Salomon Eberhard Henschen and she was also the cousin of the neurology professor David H. Ingvar and his sister Cilla Ingvar.

References

Further reading 
 

1914 births
1997 deaths
Swedish women poets
Swedish translators
Swedish Christian hymnwriters
20th-century translators
20th-century Swedish poets
20th-century Swedish women writers
Women hymnwriters
20th-century women musicians